Calvin Greenaway (11 May 1948 – 14 January 2016) was an Antigua and Barbuda sprinter. He competed in the men's 4 × 100 metres relay at the 1976 Summer Olympics.

He is also a Antiguan national record holder in pole vault. He jumped the record 380 in Newham, United Kingdom in june 1973.

References

1948 births
2016 deaths
Athletes (track and field) at the 1976 Summer Olympics
Antigua and Barbuda male sprinters
Antigua and Barbuda male long jumpers
Olympic athletes of Antigua and Barbuda
Athletes (track and field) at the 1970 British Commonwealth Games
Athletes (track and field) at the 1979 Pan American Games
Athletes (track and field) at the 1983 Pan American Games
Pan American Games competitors for Antigua and Barbuda
Place of birth missing
Commonwealth Games competitors for Antigua and Barbuda